Michael William Comrie (born September 11, 1980) is a Canadian former professional ice hockey player. During his 13-year National Hockey League (NHL) career he played with the Edmonton Oilers, Philadelphia Flyers, Phoenix Coyotes, Ottawa Senators, New York Islanders, and the Pittsburgh Penguins. He retired in early 2012 after undergoing hip surgery for the third time.

Playing career
Mike Comrie was born and raised in Edmonton, Alberta, and attended Jasper Place High School. As a youth, he played in the 1993 Quebec International Pee-Wee Hockey Tournament with a minor ice hockey team from the Whitemud region of Edmonton, Alberta. He was drafted in the third round, ninety-first overall, in the 1999 NHL Entry Draft by his hometown Edmonton Oilers out of the University of Michigan. He would go onto the Canadian Western Hockey League for 37 games before being called up to play for the Edmonton Oilers

Edmonton Oilers
Comrie left the Western Hockey League (WHL)'s Kootenay Ice midway through the 2000–01 season, signing an incentive-laden $10-million three-year deal with the Oilers, which, when all achievable bonuses were included, was well above the league maximum for the base salaries of 2001 draftees of $1.13 million a year. Although Comrie was a free agent as a result of playing one year of major junior hockey as an overage player after leaving college (due to a loophole established by Mike Van Ryn), entry-level salary restrictions still applied to Comrie's contract, with free-agent status allowing Comrie to sign with any team he desired. In Edmonton Comrie instantly become a fan favourite and hometown hero. He was an offensive threat during his first couple seasons with the team, tallying a total of 133 points in 192 games from 2001 to 2003.

Departure from Edmonton
After a lacklustre training camp in the pre-season Comrie's status as local hero in Edmonton started to change dramatically, after he elected to hold out in a contract dispute for more than 30 games into the 2003–04 season. The Oilers then-General Manager, Kevin Lowe, was reportedly willing to trade Comrie to the Anaheim Ducks for Corey Perry and a first round draft pick, but within that deal sought to have Comrie reimburse the Oilers $2.5 million, which was part of the bonus money he earned from his entry-level contract. After this deal fell through, Comrie was dealt to the Philadelphia Flyers in December 2003, for Jeff Woywitka, a first round selection in 2004 (Rob Schremp) and a third round selection in 2005 (Danny Syvret).

Philadelphia Flyers and Phoenix Coyotes
Comrie played only 21 games for Philadelphia before being traded to the Phoenix Coyotes for Sean Burke, Branko Radivojevic, and the rights to Ben Eager.

During the 2004–05 NHL lockout, he signed with Färjestad BK of the Elitserien and played ten games with them, before leaving in December 2004. Following an agreement made in July 2005, between the NHL and NHLPA members to resume hockey operations and play, Comrie would return to the Coyotes for the 2005–06 NHL season, where he would record his second 30-goal season in the NHL. The Coyotes would then re-sign Comrie to a new, one-year contract worth $3 million, on August 4, 2006.

On January 3, 2007, Comrie was traded to the Ottawa Senators in exchange for Senators prospect Alexei Kaigorodov.

Ottawa Senators and New York Islanders

Comrie scored his first goal for the Senators versus the Boston Bruins on January 9, 2007 at Scotiabank Place in Ottawa, Ontario. Whenever Comrie scored a goal at Scotiabank Place, his goal song was "Black Gloves" by the Belgian band Goose. He helped Ottawa throughout the playoffs despite having an injured shoulder that required local anesthetic to numb the pain, this prevented him from reaching down to tie his skates. The Senators made it to the Stanley Cup Finals, losing to the Anaheim Ducks, in a 4–1 series decision. Prior to the loss, the Senators eliminated the Pittsburgh Penguins, New Jersey Devils, and Buffalo Sabres all in five games.

On July 5, 2007, Mike Comrie signed a one-year contract worth $3.375 million with the New York Islanders as an unrestricted free agent. Before the trade deadline on February 26, 2008, the New York Islanders re-signed Comrie to a new one-year contract worth $4 million. Comrie would be traded back to the Senators on February 20, 2009, with Chris Campoli, in exchange for Dean McAmmond and a San Jose Sharks 2009 first round draft pick.

Return to the Oilers
On September 10, 2009, Mike Comrie signed a one-year contract worth $1.125 million with the team he began his NHL career with, returning to the Edmonton Oilers after six years, for their upcoming 2009–10 NHL season. Comrie chose to wear No. 91 (his overall draft selection number), as his familiar jersey No. 89 (which he wore during his first go-round with the team), was taken by Sam Gagner.

Comrie made his return to Edmonton a night to remember, in a 4–0 pre-season win over the Florida Panthers, on September 18, 2009. Comrie assisted on all four of the goals scored and registered a fight, squaring off with the Panthers' Eric Himelfarb, to which Comrie received a standing ovation from the Rexall Place crowd, who promptly chanted his name as he took his place inside the penalty box.

On November 17, Comrie was placed on the NHL long term injury reserve list with mononucleosis and was expected to be out until late January. He had 5 goals and 8 points, in 16 games. Comrie would make his return to the Oilers line-up on February 1, 2010, recording an assist in a 4–2 victory over the Carolina Hurricanes. He finished out the rest of the season tallying 13 goals and 21 points, in 43 games.

Mike Comrie became an unrestricted free agent on July 1, 2010, with the Oilers opting not to re-sign him for the 2010–11 season.

Pittsburgh Penguins
On September 3, 2010, Mike Comrie signed a one-year contract worth $500,000 with the Pittsburgh Penguins, joining the franchise that drafted his uncle Fred, in 1973. On September 22, 2010, Comrie scored the very first goal inside of the new Consol Energy Center, 81 seconds into the Penguins' 5-1 exhibition game victory over the Detroit Red Wings. Due to a nagging hip injury, Comrie was sidelined for much of the regular season. He scored his first goal as a Penguin during their 82nd and final game of the season, on an empty Atlanta Thrashers net. It was the last goal scored in Thrashers's home Philips Arena before the team relocated to Winnipeg in the off season.

Retirement
After undergoing hip surgery for the third time, Comrie retired from hockey on February 13, 2012.

Personal life
Comrie's father, Bill, and his uncles, Fred and John, are the founders of The Brick furniture company, which was sold in 2012 for $700 million. Comrie's mother, Theresa, died of cancer in 1990. Comrie has two older siblings; a sister, Cathy, and a brother, Paul, who played with the Oilers briefly, before Mike was drafted by them. Comrie also has two hockey playing younger half-brothers from his father's second marriage, Eric, a goaltender who was selected by the Winnipeg Jets in the 2013 NHL Entry Draft and Ty, who plays center.

Comrie began dating American actress/singer Hilary Duff in the summer of 2007. The couple announced their engagement in February 2010, and married on August 14, 2010 in Santa Barbara. They have a son born March 20, 2012. On January 10, 2014, the couple announced their separation. In February 2015, Duff filed for divorce from Comrie, citing irreconcilable differences and sought primary custody of their son. The divorce was finalized in February 2016.

Career statistics

Regular season and playoffs

International

Awards and achievements

See also
 Notable families in the NHL

References

External links

 
 Mike Comrie's Motivational Quotes

1980 births
Living people
Canadian ice hockey centres
Edmonton Oilers draft picks
Edmonton Oilers players
Färjestad BK players
Kootenay Ice players
Michigan Wolverines men's ice hockey players
New York Islanders players
Ottawa Senators players
Philadelphia Flyers players
Phoenix Coyotes players
Pittsburgh Penguins players
Sherwood Park Crusaders players
Ice hockey people from Edmonton
St. Albert Saints players
Canadian expatriate ice hockey players in Sweden
AHCA Division I men's ice hockey All-Americans